Jules Desbrochers des Loges (1836, Béthune, Pas de Calais-10 August 1913, Tours was a French entomologist.

Desbrochers was an insect dealer at first based in Vitry-aux-Loges (1880–1887), then from 1888 in Tours. He described many species including the  biological pest control agent  Northern Tamarisk Beetle.

Works
Partial list
1870 Descriptions de Coléoptères nouveaux d’Europe et confins. L’Abeille, Volume 7, Part 1: 10–135.
1881 Insectes coléoptères du nord de l’Afrique nouveaux ou peuconnus. Premier mémoire. Ténébrionides.Bulletin de l’Académie d’Hippone, 16: 51–168.
1893. Révision des espèces de curculionides appartenant à la tribu des Gymnetridae d’Europe et circa. Le Frelon, 2 (10-11): 1-18.
1893  Révision des espèces de curculionides appartenant à la tribu des Gymnetridae d’Europe et circa. Le Frelon, 2 (12): 19-36
1893 Révision des espèces de curculionides appartenant à la tribu des Gymnetridae d’Europe et circa. Le Frelon, 3 (1-2): 37-68

References
 1987 Lhoste, J. Les Entomologistes francais 1750 - 1950. INRA, OPIE (Entomology): 115 [A1036].

External links
DEI. Portrait and collection details

French entomologists
1836 births
1913 deaths